Randy Pikuzinski (born June 9, 1965) is a retired American soccer player who played professionally in the Major Indoor Soccer League, National Professional Soccer League and United Soccer League.

Pikuzinski, and his brother Rudy, learned soccer from their father who managed the amateur Buffalo White Eagles.  Both brothers played on the White Eagles.  In 1983, Pikuzinski signed with the Buffalo Stallions of the Major Indoor Soccer League out of high school.  In 1984, he played outdoor soccer with the Buffalo Storm of the United Soccer League.  In 1985, Pikuzinski signed with the Canton Invaders of the American Indoor Soccer Association.  He saw little playing time his season and a half with the Invaders, but became a key player during the second half of the 1986–1987 season.  At the end of the season, he became a free agent and signed with the Milwaukee Wave.  During the 1987 outdoor season he featured in the National Soccer League with St. Catharines Wolves. In January 1988, the Wave traded him to the Canton Invaders in exchange for Tim Tyma and Pete Smith.  He went on to win two more AISA championships with the Invaders.  In October 1991, the Invaders traded Pikuzinski to the Chicago Power in exchange for the Power's 1992 first round draft pick.  In September 1992, the Power traded Pikuzinski to the Buffalo Blizzard in exchange for Russ Prince, Chuck Codd and Ko Thandabouth.  He would remain with the Blizzard until 2001.  That year, the Blizzard folded and the Harrisburg Heat selected Pikuzinski in the dispersal draft.  Pikuzinski retired.

His brother Rudy was also a professional soccer player. He holds the appearance record for the NPSL, with 508 appearances. 

Randy has two children, Randy Jr. and Ryan.

References

External links
 MISL stats
All Time NPSL Stats

1965 births
Living people
American soccer players
American expatriate soccer players
American Indoor Soccer Association players
Buffalo Blizzard players
Buffalo Stallions players
Buffalo Storm players
Canton Invaders players
Chicago Power players
St. Catharines Roma Wolves players
Major Indoor Soccer League (1978–1992) players
Milwaukee Wave players
National Professional Soccer League (1984–2001) players
United Soccer League (1984–85) players
People from Cheektowaga, New York
Soccer players from New York (state)
Expatriate soccer players in Canada
American expatriate sportspeople in Canada
Canadian National Soccer League players
Association football forwards 
Association football midfielders